is a passenger railway station in the town of Ogawa, Saitama, Japan, operated by East Japan Railway Company (JR East).

Lines

Station layout
The station originally had two opposed side platforms serving two tracks, forming a passing loop on the single-track line, with the station building located on the south side and the platforms connected by a footbridge. From 15 October 2016, the up (for Komagawa) platform was decommissioned and the track removed, with trains in both directions using the remaining (former down) platform. The station is unattended.

Platforms

History
The station opened on 6 October 1934. With the privatization of Japanese National Railways (JNR) on 1 April 1987, the station came under the control of JR East. The station building was rebuilt in 2008.

Passenger statistics
In fiscal 2010, the station was used by an average of 31 passengers daily (boarding passengers only).

Surrounding area

 Tōbu Takezawa Station (Tobu Tojo Line) (approximately 500 m away)
 
 Takezawa Elementary School

See also
 List of railway stations in Japan

References

External links

  

Stations of East Japan Railway Company
Railway stations in Saitama Prefecture
Hachikō Line
Railway stations in Japan opened in 1934
Ogawa, Saitama